Mansface Hill is a mountain located in Green River, Wyoming. The mountain is named for its rock outcroppings, which form the shape of a face looking up into the sky.

Access
Mansface is accessible from Green River via two access roads. The first road begins at the top of an area known as South Hill on Wyoming Highway 530. This route follows a pipeline for about half a mile and then begins turning north to the summit of the hill. The second begins near the west end of River View Drive in Green River. Google Earth and most GPS maps identify the road to the summit on the west side as "Knotty Pine Street." During the winter, the road is often drifted over, and some times impassable.

Summit
On the summit of the hill are various radio towers for both local business and government entities. A tower for the city of Green River  's police department is the newest tower, constructed some time in the summer of 2004. A local cellular telephone tower is located at the center of the hill, and is primarily what can be seen from surrounding areas. It was constructed in late 2001 and early 2002. The hill also has a tower for local KCSP affiliate radio station K232CU, which serves Green River on 94.3 FM.

Christmas tree
Every year in either late November or early December, several local residents haul a Christmas tree to the summit. The tree is decorated and is lit at night. Power to the tree comes from the tower farm located nearby. In 2007, the tree was placed by members of the local business "The Radio Network", which owns radio stations KFRZ, KYCS, KUGR, and KZWB.

References

See also
List of rock formations that resemble human beings

Mountains of Wyoming
Mountains of Sweetwater County, Wyoming